On 11 February 2014, a C-130 Hercules military transport aircraft of the Algerian Air Force, carrying 74 passengers and 4 crew members, crashed into Djebel Fertas mountain near Aïn Kercha, Algeria. Only one person survived.

Preliminary reports suggest that bad weather conditions might have caused the crash. The accident is under investigation.

Weather conditions 
Algerian defence ministry said the crash was likely caused by bad weather, including a storm and cascading snow, which Algerian aviation experts said most likely had led to poor visibility.

Accident 
Contact with the aircraft was reportedly lost between Constantine and Oum El Bouaghi just before noon and air traffic controllers dispatched helicopters to search for it. The sole survivor, a soldier, was taken to a military hospital in Constantine due to injuries from head trauma. The passengers included soldiers and members of their families.

Aircraft 
The aircraft was a US-manufactured C-130 Hercules with the registration number 7T-WHM. Lockheed Martin confirmed it sold C-130H aircraft to Algeria from 1981 to 1990. , Algeria had 16 of the type according to FlightGlobal.

Investigation 
Recovery teams located one of the two flight recorders, according to El Watan. Emergency services had recovered 76 bodies from the site.

Reaction 
Algerian president Abdelaziz Bouteflika announced three days of state mourning starting 12 February, while also praising the dead soldiers as "martyrs". The defence ministry said it had established an investigative commission and that army chief of staff and deputy defence minister Ahmed Gaid Salah would visit the crash site.

See also 
2012 Norwegian C-130 crash
Mirosławiec air disaster
List of sole survivors of airline accidents or incidents
List of accidents and incidents involving the Lockheed C-130 Hercules
2018 Algerian Air Force crash

References 

Aviation accidents and incidents in Algeria
2014 in Algeria
Aviation accidents and incidents in 2014
Accidents and incidents involving the Lockheed C-130 Hercules
Oum El Bouaghi Province
February 2014 events in Africa
2014 disasters in Algeria